Balázs Attila Megyeri (born 31 March 1990) is a Hungarian professional footballer who plays as a goalkeeper for Debreceni VSC.

Club career

Ferencváros
Born in Budapest, Megyeri began his career with Ferencvárosi TC and played a short time in the youth side for Bristol City, before returning to his previous club in 2008. On 23 August 2009, he began a short trial with Hertha BSC Berlin, but nothing came of it.

Megyeri made his Nemzeti Bajnokság I debut on 26 August, starting in a 0–0 away draw against Szombathelyi Haladás. He appeared in 24 league matches during the campaign, with his side finishing seventh.

Olympiacos
On 15 June 2010, Megyeri signed a three-year contract with Olympiacos. He took part in the international match "8th Match Against Poverty" on 14 December at the Karaiskakis Stadium, as the club's All Star team goalkeeper.

Megyeri made his debut for the club on 3 April 2011, playing the full 90 minutes in a 3–1 home win against Kavala. He appeared in only three matches during the campaign, being a third-choice behind Antonis Nikopolidis and Urko Pardo.

After Nikopolidis' retirement and Pardo's departure to APOEL, Megyeri was challenged by new signings Franco Costanzo and Iosif Daskalakis. After Constanzo's poor performances, he was elected as first-choice; despite the arrival of Roy Carroll in January 2012, he continued to appear regularly, contributing with 22 matches.

Megyeri battled for the starting spot with Carroll in 2012–13, but was later overtaken by new signing Roberto in the following season.

Getafe
On 15 July 2015 Megyeri signed a three-year deal with La Liga side Getafe CF, after his contract with Olympiacos expired.

International career
After representing Hungary in the under-21 level, Megyeri was called up to the main squad on 16 May 2012, for a friendly against Czech Republic. However, he was only an unused substitute during the match. Megyeri was named in Hungary's provisional squad for UEFA Euro 2016 but was cut from the final squad.

Club statistics

Honours

Club
Ferencváros
Nemzeti Bajnokság II: 2008–09

Olympiacos
Superleague: 2010–11, 2011–12, 2012–13, 2013–14, 2014–15
Greek Cup: 2011–12, 2012–13, 2014–15

International
FIFA U-20 World Cup: 2009 Third place

Individual
Nándor Hidegkuti Prize: 2009–10

References

Légiósok: Megyeri a német másodosztályban folytatja, nemzetisport.hu, 20 June 2016

External links
Magyar Futball profile 

1991 births
Living people
Footballers from Budapest
Hungarian footballers
Association football goalkeepers
Nemzeti Bajnokság I players
Ferencvárosi TC footballers
Super League Greece players
Olympiacos F.C. players
Atromitos F.C. players
La Liga players
Getafe CF footballers
2. Bundesliga players
SpVgg Greuther Fürth players
Cypriot First Division players
AEL Limassol players
Debreceni VSC players
Hungary under-21 international footballers
Hungarian expatriate footballers
Expatriate footballers in England
Hungarian expatriate sportspeople in England
Expatriate footballers in Greece
Hungarian expatriate sportspeople in Greece
Expatriate footballers in Spain
Hungarian expatriate sportspeople in Spain
Expatriate footballers in Turkey
Hungarian expatriate sportspeople in Turkey
Expatriate footballers in Cyprus
Hungarian expatriate sportspeople in Cyprus
Hungary international footballers